Wondimu Kurta is an Ethiopian politician who has been serving as speaker of South West Ethiopia Peoples' Region since 2021.

References

Ethiopian politicians
Living people
Year of birth missing (living people)